The Bat Segundo Show was a podcast based in New York City run by writer and literary critic Edward Champion between 2004 and 2012. It was revived in mid-2013.

The program features comprehensive interviews with prominent figures in arts and culture, with a special focus on literature.  Past guests have included David Mitchell, David Lynch, Amy Sedaris, Nora Ephron, John Updike, Errol Morris, Nicholson Baker and others. It was one of the first in-depth literary podcasts created exclusively for the Internet. The program has been singled out by the Washington Times in 2007 and The Los Angeles Times in 2008.

History
The Bat Segundo Show started in 2004, as a "shameless excuse to interview David Mitchell." Needing an introduction, Champion took the name of "Bat Segundo" from Mitchell's first novel, Ghostwritten, (later obtaining Mitchell's permission) and created "a deliberately unappealing and grating character" to introduce each segment. Bat Segundo is "a former radio DJ" who is "believed to be 49 years old." He spends "most of his time living in a Motel 6 room and is very fond of tequila." A Spanish-speaking character named "Jorge," described as "a key component to getting Mr. Segundo recording his introductions" and "also instrumental in getting the listener excited about the program," soon followed.

Other characters who have appeared are the Three Cheap Tenors, who sing songs for particular guests, and Doris Segundo, an ex-wife of Bat Segundo who regularly demands alimony.

The interviews are conducted by "Our Young, Roving Correspondent," a stand-in for Champion. The questions asked are often tough and quite detailed, sometimes surprising the authors themselves. Champion prepares "by reading an author's most recent book, and sometimes additional volumes in the backlist." He then tries "to determine what questions have been asked of an author and strikes these angles off my list, if at all possible."

Bat Segundo was killed off on Show #199, the victim of an apparent shooting. But there were some suggestions in later introductions that Mr. Segundo was not dead. Mr. Segundo then resurfaced during the introduction for Show #226, now apparently residing somewhere in East Los Angeles, and has since made steady but less frequent appearances.

Final episode
Champion announced that he was giving up the show on September 21, 2012, writing, "This was a very fun part of my life, but I've got to move on." The last episode of The Bat Segundo Show aired on November 5, 2012.

Revival
Champion returned with new episodes in June 2013, with the Bat Segundo character dropped. The program shifted to a weekly format, with new episodes of Champion's other show, Follow Your Ears, appearing in The Bat Segundo Shows place during the last week of every month.

References

External links
 
 

American radio programs
Audio podcasts
American literature
2004 podcast debuts
Interview podcasts 
American podcasts